Flandres Bay is a large bay lying between Cape Renard and Cape Willems, along the west coast of Graham Land, Antarctica. It was explored in 1898 by the Belgian Antarctic Expedition under Gerlache, who named it, probably after the historical area of Flanders.

References 

Bays of Graham Land
Danco Coast